Silene bernardina is a species of flowering plant in the family Caryophyllaceae known by the common name Palmer's catchfly.

It is native to western North America from Washington and Idaho, through California and Oregon, to Baja California. It grows in several types of habitat, including chaparral scrub, mountain forests, and higher-elevation habitats in alpine climates.

Description
Silene bernardina is a variable plant and it is divided into several subspecies. In general, it is a perennial herb growing from a taproot and leafy caudex unit, the hairy, erect stems growing up to about half a meter tall. The slender stems have glandular, sticky patches on their upper parts. The linear or lance-shaped leaves are up to 8 centimeters long low on the stem and smaller on the distal branches.

Flowers occur in a terminal cyme at the top of the stem, as well as in some of the leaf axils. Each has a hairy, glandular calyx of fused sepals with ten red veins. The calyx is open at the top, revealing five white or purple-pink petals which may be almost 3 centimeters long. The petals have usually four fringelike lobes at the tips and feathery appendages at their bases. The stamens and three or four long styles protrude from the flower's center.

References

External links
Jepson Manual Treatment
USDA Plants Profile
Flora of North America
Photo gallery

bernardina
Flora of Baja California
Flora of the Northwestern United States
Flora of the Southwestern United States
Flora without expected TNC conservation status